Akbar Riansyah Aditya Putra (born 6 March 1993) is an Indonesian professional footballer who plays as a right-back.

Club career

PSIS Semarang
In 2018 Ardiansyah signed for Liga 1 club PSIS Semarang.

Cilegon United
He was signed for Cilegon United to play in Liga 2 in the 2020 season.

References

External links
 Akbar Riansyah at Liga Indonesia
 Akbar Riansyah at Soccerway

1993 births
Living people
Indonesian footballers
PSIS Semarang players
Association football defenders
People from Karanganyar Regency
Sportspeople from Central Java